Cochrane Station was the second of three stations on the Ropes Creek railway line in Sydney, New South Wales, Australia.

History
The station was built because of increased passenger numbers and increased production at the St. Marys Munitions Works site along with the arrival of electrification in 1957. The station itself was classed as unattended because most of the workers using the station had weekly tickets or return tickets, making ticket selling facilities unnecessary. The station starts on a slight right-hand bend (looking towards Ropes Creek) and straightens out towards the middle. An overhead road bridge ran over the station; the waiting room was built underneath the bridge. The station was about 165 metres long and could accommodate an eight-car suburban train.

References

Disused railway stations in Sydney
Railway stations in Australia opened in 1957
Railway stations closed in 1986
1986 disestablishments in Australia